Française des Jeux (FDJ) is the operator of France's national lottery games, and the title sponsor of the FDJ cycling team. The name of the company loosely translates as The French Company of Games. The company was previously owned and operated by the French government. In July 2018, the French government, which owned 72% of FDJ, has decided to take the company public and sell off 50% of its ownership. This is in hopes of rejuvenating the national treasury.

In addition to lottery games, the company also provides online games and sports betting markets, such as association football, cycling, rugby union, and track and field.

The company sponsors two professional cycling teams - Groupama–FDJ in the UCI World Tour since 1997, and FDJ Suez Futuroscope in the UCI Women's World Tour since 2017.

References

External links
Official Française des Jeux−FDJ website

Lotteries
Gambling in France
Government-owned companies of France
Entertainment companies established in 1976
1976 establishments in France
2019 initial public offerings
Companies listed on Euronext Paris